

The Boeing Model 7, a.k.a. Boeing BB-1 was an American biplane flying boat aircraft built by Boeing in the 1920s.
The pilot and two passengers all sat in the cockpit, the passengers right behind the pilot.

Specifications (variant)

References

 

1920s United States civil utility aircraft
Flying boats
007, Boeing
Single-engined pusher aircraft
Biplanes
Aircraft first flown in 1920